The Master of the Cologne Legend of St. Ursula (active 1489 – 1515) was a German Renaissance painter.

Biography
He was named Meister der Kölner Ursula-Legende after a series of paintings depicting the life of Saint Ursula once found in the Basilica of St. Severin, Cologne. Since World War II, when much of the series was lost, the remaining fragments of paintings have been scattered in various museums.

He is not to be confused with the Master of St. Severin, also from Cologne, who worked in the same period, or with the Bruges master named for a different version of the life of Ursula.

References

External links

Master of the St. Ursula legend at the Victoria and Albert Museum

1470s births
1515 deaths
German painters
Artists from Cologne
Legend of St. Ursula (Cologne)